White Lake is a lake located south of Holiday House and north of Woodgate in Oneida County, New York. It drains via White Lake Outlet and ultimately its waters reach the Black River via Bear Creek and Woodhull Creek. Fish species present in the lake are brook trout, rainbow trout, and yellow perch. The community of White Lake surrounds the lake.

References 

Lakes of New York (state)